Code for Canada is a nonprofit organization (NPO) that was co-founded in 2017 by the government of the province of Ontario, Canada with a mandate to work with the technology and government sectors and innovators from the community, to improve digital technologies that underlie government services.

Background
According to a January 2017 interview with Gabe Sawhney, Code for Canada Executive Director and Co-founder of NOW Magazine, Code for Canada is modeled after Code for America and its "chapters in Australia, Germany, Mexico and Pakistan." Sawhney said that their target audience included committed tech innovators, inside and outside government, willing to partner to find technological and design solutions for civic issues. Code for Canada, is similar to the civic technology movement in the United States, Code for America and Code for Australia. 

In April 2017, Deb Matthews, the Ontario minister for digital governance announced that the Province of Ontario was co-founding Code for Canada with a contribution of $700,000. Code for Canada's designers and coders work with government to improve and/or create "high-technology" coding that is "simpler, faster and easier to use", resulting in the provision of better government services that cost less.

Mandate
Code for Canada works with communities and government in Canada to improve digital technologies.

Fellowships program
Through their fellowship program, Code for Canada, fellows who are digital technology and design experts, spend 10 months working collaboratively with public servants in government departments to improve services. Fellows demonstrate the most recent "methods in software development, design thinking, user experience research and product management," and examine how the "Internet and data can support and serve Canadian civil society, and our values of fairness and inclusivity."

In 2017 Code for Canada offered Federal Fellowship with the Canadian Digital Service (CDS) and Veterans Affairs Canada (VAC). By January 2017, Code for Canada had already received 300 applications for their first team of six Fellows.

Leon Lukashevsky, a 2017 fellow with "web development skills", described how Code for Canada Fellows work to make "Canadian civil services" more "digitally savvy". In his 2017 article in Medium, Lukashevsky wrote that, "Modern governments need to understand and leverage the Internet to actualize public policy and meet residents’ expectations." He described the Fellows as "democracy-driven" and compared it to the process behind the creation of e-Estonia, and its underlying digital platform X-Road. Estonia, tagged the "Digital Republic" by The New Yorker, launched e-Estonia in 2017 to improve interactions between citizens and government through electronic solutions. He noted that X-Road architects had "turned to democratic ideals for guidance." Lukashevsky described the goal of this collaboration with CDS and VAC, was to "improve Canadian veterans' awareness of — and access to — benefits and services ... to improve their quality of life."

In 2018, Christine Lee, Product Strategy, Design, and Management expert and Code for Canada fellow with the Government of Ontario’s Ministry of Advanced Education & Skill Development, led a team "building products collaboratively using discovery sprints". Lee's professional background is in "digital product management, development, and finance".

See also
Code for America
Code for America Commons (CfA)
Civic Commons

Notes

References

Non-profit organizations based in Canada
Transparency (behavior)
Politics and technology
Open government
Non-profit organizations based in Toronto
Open government in Canada